Francis Fullwood (died 1693) was the Archdeacon of Totnes from 1660.

He was born at Exeter, the son of Fr(ancis) Fullwood, S.T.D. and was installed as archdeacon of Totnes in 1660. He then studied at Exeter College, Oxford, matriculating in 1668.  He entered the Inner Temple in 1671.

A book published in 1690 entitled Reflection, in Vindication of One Arch-Deacon (and Consequently of All) from the Scurrilous and Groundless Invectives Against Him referred to him.

References

Archdeacons of Totnes
1693 deaths
Year of birth unknown